Okatana is an ephemeral river in the north of Namibia. It forms part of the Cuvelai basin. It has two channels, one running through Oshakati, serving as the boundary between the constituencies of Oshakati West and Oshakati East; the other running east of town. The two channels rejoin south of Oshakati, and the river flows into the Etosha pan. The river provides a source of water to people who leave nearby the river and food during rainy season. During rainy season it affects the community economically, socially and educationally. The ways are cut off; schools are closed due to this river. This is always made difficult for the students and teachers to close this river.

References

Rivers of Namibia
Oshakati